Indian Cabins is an unincorporated community in northern Alberta in Mackenzie County, located on Highway 35 and the Hay River,  north of High Level, and  south of the Northwest Territories-Alberta border. It is the northernmost community in Alberta.

Gas station 
Most people stopped here for gas at the Indian Cabins Trading Post, however, in early 2019, its tanks were no longer certified, resulting in the closure of the gas station. With the closure of the Enterprise gas station a few weeks before, there was a  gap in gas stations on the Mackenzie Highway. However, a fuel system was introduced sometime in winter 2020 back to the Indian Cabins Trading Post. Other than the gas station and convenience store, there are a few trailers in the community.

References

Localities in Mackenzie County